Seether: 2002–2013 is the fourth compilation album by South African rock band Seether. It was released on 29 October 2013 through Wind-up Records. It is entirely produced by Brendan O'Brien.

The first disc comprises the band's well-known songs and singles, while the second disc comprises a cover of Veruca Salt's song "Seether", the song after which the band is named, two new studio tracks, plus unreleased demos, B-sides, and soundtrack songs.

Track listing

Reception

In his review for AllMusic, Stephen Thomas Erlewine calls the album "a by-the-books greatest-hits, a 15-track overview" with an ugly cover of a dog defecating. Regarding the contents of the compilation, he notes the emphasis on the band's latter-day albums over the earlier works. The inclusion on a cover version of Veruca Salt's "Seether" on a second disc of rarities, demos, and B-sides "should please fans".

References

External links
https://itunes.apple.com/us/album/seether-2002-2013/id696987960

2013 greatest hits albums
Seether albums